The 2020 Major League Baseball season was the San Francisco Giants' 138th year in MLB, their 63rd year in San Francisco since their move from New York following the 1957 season, and their 21st at Oracle Park. It was the first under the leadership of the team's new manager, Gabe Kapler, who replaced the recently retired Bruce Bochy, and new team general manager Scott Harris.

On March 12, 2020, MLB announced that because of the ongoing COVID-19 pandemic, the start of the regular season would be delayed by at least two weeks in addition to the remainder of spring training being cancelled. Four days later, it was announced that the start of the season would be pushed back indefinitely due to the recommendation made by the CDC to restrict events of more than 50 people for eight weeks. On June 23, commissioner Rob Manfred unilaterally implemented a 60-game season. Players reported to training camps on July 1 in order to resume spring training and prepare for a July 23 Opening Day.

Season standings

National League West

National League Division Standings

Record vs. opponents

Game log

|- style="background:#fbb;"
| 1 || July 23 || @ Dodgers || 1–8 || Kolarek (1–0) || Rogers (0–1) || — || 0–1
|- style="background:#fbb;"
| 2 || July 24 || @ Dodgers || 1–9 || Stripling (1–0) || Anderson (0–1) || — || 0–2
|- style="background:#cfc;"
| 3 || July 25 || @ Dodgers || 5–4 || Baragar (1–0) || Wood (0–1) || Gott (1) || 1–2
|- style="background:#cfc;"
| 4 || July 26 || @ Dodgers || 3–1 || Peralta (1–0) || Graterol (0–1) || Gott (2) || 2–2
|- style="background:#fbb;"
| 5 || July 28 || Padres || 3–5 || Davies (1–0) || Samardzija (0–1) || Pomeranz (1) || 2–3
|- style="background:#cfc;"
| 6 || July 29 || Padres || 7–6 || Rogers (1–1) || Strahm (0–1) || — || 3–3 
|- style="background:#fbb;"
| 7 || July 30 || Padres || 7–12  || Johnson (1–0) || Rogers (1–2) || — || 3–4
|- style="background:#cfc;"
| 8 || July 31 || Rangers || 9–2 || Menez (1–0) || Minor (0–2) || — || 4–4
|-

|- style="background:#cfc;"
| 9 || August 1 || Rangers || 7–3 || Baragar (2–0) || Lyles (0–1) || — || 5–4
|- style="background:#fbb;"
| 10 || August 2 || Rangers || 5–9 || Hernández (2–0) || Triggs (0–1) || — || 5–5
|- style="background:#fbb;"
| 11 || August 3 || @ Rockies || 6–7 || Hoffman (1–0) || Peralta (1–1) || Díaz (2) || 5–6
|- style="background:#fbb;"
| 12 || August 4 || @ Rockies || 2–5 || Márquez (2–1) || Gausman (0–1) || Almonte (1) || 5–7
|- style="background:#cfc;"
| 13 || August 5 || @ Rockies || 4–3 || Webb (1–0) || Gray (0–1) || Gott (3) || 6–7
|- style="background:#fbb;"
| 14 || August 6 || @ Rockies || 4–6 || Almonte (1–0) || Garcia (0–1) || Díaz (3) || 6–8
|- style="background:#fbb;"
| 15 || August 7 || @ Dodgers || 2–7 || Floro (1–0) || Samardzija (0–2) || — || 6–9
|- style="background:#cfc;"
| 16 || August 8 || @ Dodgers || 5–4 || Cueto (1–0) || Kershaw (1–1) || Gott (4) || 7–9
|- style="background:#fbb;"
| 17 || August 9 || @ Dodgers || 2–6 || McGee (1–0) || Rogers (1–3) || — || 7–10
|- style="background:#fbb;"
| 18 || August 10 || @ Astros || 4–6 || McCullers Jr. (2–1) || Webb (1–1) || Pressly (1) || 7–11
|- style="background:#cfc;"
| 19 || August 11 || @ Astros || 7–6  || Gott (1–0) || Sneed (0–3) || Rogers (1) || 8–11
|- style="background:#fbb;"
| 20 || August 12 || @ Astros || 1–5 || Greinke (1–0) || Baragar (2–1) || — || 8–12
|- style="background:#fbb;"
| 21 || August 14 || Athletics || 7–8  || Soria (2–0) || García (0–1) || Hendriks (6) || 8–13
|- style="background:#fbb;"
| 22 || August 15 || Athletics || 6–7 || McFarland (2–0) || Gott (1–1) || Hendriks (7) || 8–14
|- style="background:#fbb;"
| 23 || August 16 || Athletics || 3–15 || Fiers (2–1) || Webb (1–2) || — || 8–15
|- style="background:#fbb;"
| 24 || August 17 || @ Angels || 6–7 || Buttrey (1–0) || Gott (1–2) || — || 8–16
|- style="background:#cfc;"
| 25 || August 18 || @ Angels || 8–2 || García (1–1) || Bundy (3–2) || — || 9–16
|- style="background:#cfc;"
| 26 || August 19 || Angels || 7–2 || Cueto (2–0) || Sandoval (0–3) || — || 10–16
|- style="background:#cfc;"
| 27 || August 20 || Angels || 10–5 || Gausman (1–1) || Suárez (0–1) || — || 11–16
|- style="background:#cfc;"
| 28 || August 21 || Diamondbacks || 6–2 || Webb (2–2) || Ray (1–3) || — || 12–16
|- style="background:#cfc;"
| 29 || August 22 || Diamondbacks || 5–1 || Anderson (1–1) || Grace (0–1) || — || 13–16
|- style="background:#cfc;"
| 30 || August 23 || Diamondbacks || 6–1 || Baragar (3–1) || Weaver (1–4) || — || 14–16
|- style="background:#cfc;"
| 31 || August 25 || Dodgers || 10–8  || Selman (1–0) || Santana (1–2) || — || 15–16
|- style="background:#bbb;"
| — || August 26 || Dodgers || colspan=7 | Postponed (Boycotts due to Jacob Blake shooting); Makeup: August 27 
|- style="background:#fbb;"
| 32 || August 27 || Dodgers  || 0–7  || Kershaw (4–1) || Webb (2–3) || — || 15–17
|- style="background:#fbb;"
| 33 || August 27 || Dodgers  || 0–2  || González (2–0) || Gausman (1–2) || Jansen (8) || 15–18 
|- style="background:#fbb;"
| 34 || August 28 || @ Diamondbacks || 4–7 || Gallen (1–0) || Anderson (1–2) || — || 15–19
|- style="background:#cfc;"
| 35 || August 29 || @ Diamondbacks || 5–2 || Garcia (2–1) || Weaver (1–5) || Rogers (2) || 16–19
|- style="background:#cfc;"
| 36 || August 30 || @ Diamondbacks || 4–1 || Watson (1–0) || Crichton (2–2) || Coonrod (1) || 17–19
|-

|- style="background:#cfc;"
| 37 || September 1 || @ Rockies || 23–5 || Gausman (2–2) || Gray (2–4) || — || 18–19
|- style="background:#fbb;"
| 38 || September 2 || @ Rockies || 6–9 || Givens (1–1) || Coonrod (0–1) || Bard (4) || 18–20
|- style="background:#fbb;"
| 39 || September 4 || Diamondbacks || 5–6 || Bergen (1–0) || Anderson (1–3) || Ginkel (1) || 18–21
|- style="background:#cfc;"
| 40 || September 5 || Diamondbacks || 4–3 || Baragar (4–1) || Bumgarner (0–4) || Watson (1) || 19–21
|- style="background:#cfc;"
| 41 || September 6 || Diamondbacks || 4–2 || Baragar (5–1) || Young (1–3) || Rogers (3) || 20–21
|- style="background:#cfc;"
| 42 || September 7 || Diamondbacks || 4–2 || Gausman (3–2) || Gallen (1–1) || Coonrod (2) || 21–21
|- style="background:#cfc;"
| 43 || September 8 || Mariners || 6–5 || Rogers (2–3) || Misiewicz (0–2) || Watson (2) || 22–21
|- style="background:#cfc;"
| 44 || September 9 || Mariners || 10–1 || Anderson (2–3) || Margevicius (1–3) || — || 23–21
|- style="background:#fbb;"
| 45 || September 10 || @ Padres || 1–6 || Morejón (2–0) || Cahill (0–1) || — || 23–22
|- style="background:#bbb;"
| — || September 11 || @ Padres || colspan=7 | Postponed (COVID-19); Makeup: September 13 
|- style="background:#bbb;"
| — || September 12 || @ Padres || colspan=7 | Postponed (COVID-19); Makeup: September 25 
|- style="background:#fbb;"
| 46 || September 13 || @ Padres  || 0–6  || Clevinger (3–2) || Cueto (2–1) || — || 23–23
|- style="background:#fbb;"
| 47 || September 13 || @ Padres  || 1–3  || Hill (3–0) || Selman (1–1) || Rosenthal (10) || 23–24
|- style="background:#bbb;"
| — || September 15 || @ Mariners || colspan=7 | Postponed (Bad Air Quality); Makeup: September 17
|- style="background:#cfc;"
| 48 ||  || @ Mariners || 9–3 || Cahill (1–1) || Newsome (0–1) || — || 24–24
|- style="background:#cfc;"
| 49 ||  || @ Mariners || 6–4 || Garcia (1–1) || Graveman (0–3) || Selman (1) || 25–24
|- style="background:#fbb;"
| 50 || September 18 || @ Athletics || 0–6 || Bassitt (5–2) || Webb (2–4) || — || 25–25
|- style="background:#fbb;"
| 51 || September 19 || @ Athletics || 0–6 || Luzardo (3–2) || Gausman (3–3) || — || 25–26
|- style="background:#cfc;"
| 52 || September 20 || @ Athletics || 14–2 || Anderson (3–3) || Minor (1–6) || — || 26–26
|- style="background:#fbb;"
| 53 || September 21 || Rockies || 2–7 || Márquez (3–6) ||  Cueto (2–2) || — || 26–27
|- style="background:#cfc;"
| 54 || September 22 || Rockies || 5–2 || Rogers (3–3) || Díaz (1–2) || Coonrod (3) || 27–27
|- style="background:#cfc;"
| 55 || September 23 || Rockies || 7–2 || Webb (3–4) || Castellani (1–4) || — || 28–27
|- style="background:#fbb;"
| 56 || September 24 || Rockies || 4–5  || Bard (4–2) || Cahill (1–2) || Díaz (4) || 28–28
|- style="background:#cfc;"
| 57 || September 25 || Padres  || 5–4  || Anderson (4–3) || Paddack (4–5) || — || 29–28
|- style="background:#fbb;"
| 58 || September 25 || @ Padres  || 5–6  || Patiño (1–0) || Coonrod (0–2) || — || 29–29
|- style="background:#fbb;"
| 59 || September 26 || Padres || 2–6 || Stammen (4–2) || Cueto (2–3) || — || 29–30
|- style="background:#fbb;"
| 60 || September 27 || Padres || 4–5 || Altavilla (2–3) || Smyly (0–1) || Rosenthal (11) || 29–31
|-

|- style="text-align:center;"
| Legend:       = Win       = Loss       = PostponementBold = Giants team member

Roster

Farm system

References

External links
San Francisco Giants 2020 Schedule at MLB.com
2020 San Francisco Giants season at Baseball Reference

San Francisco Giants
San Francisco Giants seasons
San Francisco Giants